Nicholas Canaday Spitzer is a Distinguished Professor in the Division of Biological Sciences at the University of California, San Diego.

Education
Spitzer received his Ph.D from Harvard University and was a postdoctoral fellow at Harvard and University College, London.

Career 
Spitzer joined the UCSD faculty in 1972 and has been the recipient of a Sloan Fellowship, a Javits Neuroscience Investigator Award and a Guggenheim Fellowship. He was founding editor-in-chief of BrainFacts.org, a fellow of the American Association for the Advancement of Science, a member of the American Academy of Arts and Sciences and the National Academy of Sciences, and director of the UCSD Kavli Institute for Brain and Mind. Spitzer's lab is engaged in studying the mechanisms by which neurons differentiate to achieve the unparalleled complexity of the brain.
 2022 American Philosophical Society's Lashley Award

References

Year of birth missing (living people)
Living people
Harvard University alumni
Harvard University faculty
American neuroscientists